Batoche was a territorial electoral district in the Northwest Territories that existed from 1888 to 1905.

Members of the Legislative Assembly (MLAs)

Election results

1888 election

1891 election

Charles Nolin was removed from his seat by judicial order after it was determined one of his agents controverted the election with corrupt practices, a by-election was held in the district on March 15, 1892.

1892 election

1894 election

1898 election

1902 election

References

Former electoral districts of Northwest Territories